Garifuna Americans or Black Carib Americans are Americans who are descendants of free African people and Indigenous people of the Americas that originated in the Caribbean island of Saint Vincent and the Grenadines. Garifuna Americans whose ancestors were exiled from the Island trace their roots to the Central American countries of Honduras, Guatemala, Belize, and Nicaragua, while those whose ancestors remained in the island trace their roots to Saint Vincent and the Grenadines. The term refers to someone with full or partial Garifuna heritage who was born in the United States. They trace their ancestry to the Garifuna, who were descendents of Arawak, Kalinago (Island Carib), and Afro-Caribbean people living in Saint Vincent.

Cultural events
, Abrazo Garifuna in New York, an event celebrating the contributions of Garifuna Americans to New York City is in its second year. Abrazo Garifuna in New York continues to be held annually as of 2014.

Notable people
 Teofilo Colon Jr. - Photographer 
 Evil E - musical artist
 O.T Genasis – rapper
 Brian Flores - Football Coach
 Kosine - Music Producer
 Abe Laboriel Jr - Drummer
 Milton Palacio - NBA Player
 Demi Singleton - Actress
 Vic Barrett - Activist

See also
 Garifuna music
 Happy Land fire

References

Further reading
 Chaney, James. "Malleable Identities: Placing The Garínagu In New Orleans." Journal of Latin American Geography 11.2 (2012): 121-144. Academic Search Complete. Web. 20 June 2015.
 England, Sarah. "Transnational Movements, Racialized Space", Afro Central Americans in New York City: Garifuna Tales of Transnational Movements in Racialized Space. Gainesville: University Press of Florida, 2006: 29
 Matthei, Linda M., and David A. Smith. "Flexible Ethnic Identity, Adaptation, Survival, Resistance: The Garifuna In The World-System." Social Identities 14.2 (2008): 215-232. Academic Search Complete. Web. 20 June 2015.
 Swain, Liz. "Garifuna Americans." Gale Encyclopedia of Multicultural America. Ed. Jeffrey Lehman. 2nd ed. Vol. 1. Detroit: Gale, 2000. 686-697. Gale Virtual Reference Library. Web. 20 June 2015.

External links
 Garifuna American Heritage Foundation United

Garifuna
Black Native Americans